Brother, the Great Spirit Made Us All is a 1974 studio album by Dave Brubeck accompanied by his sons Darius, Chris and Dan.

Reception

The album was reviewed by Scott Yanow at Allmusic who wrote that the musicians "...perform colorful treatments of a wide variety of swinging pieces. Highlights include "It's a Raggy Waltz," "Temptation Boogie" and "Christopher Columbus"; Dave Brubeck takes "The Duke" solo. This fine music was last available on LP."

Track listing 
 "Mr. Broadway" - 2:44
 "Forty Days" - 7:20
 "The Duke" - 2:48
 "It's a Raggy Waltz" - 6:00 5
 "Sky Scape" (Darius Brubeck) - 2:42
 "Temptation Boogie" (Darius Brubeck) - 8:20
 "Ragaroni" (Perry Robinson) - 2:50
 "Christopher Columbus" (Chu Berry, Andy Razaf) - 4:00

All compositions by Dave Brubeck, other composers indicated.

Personnel 
 Dave Brubeck - piano
 Darius Brubeck - electric piano
 Jerry Bergonzi - soprano saxophone, tenor saxophone
 Chris Brubeck - electric bass, trombone
 Dan Brubeck - drums
 David Powell - double bass
 Perry Robinson - clarinet
 Peter "Madcat" Ruth - harmonica, Jew's harp
 Michael Cuscuna - producer

References

1975 albums
Albums produced by Michael Cuscuna
Dave Brubeck albums
Atlantic Records albums